Britney Ever After is a 2017 American biographical drama television film directed by Leslie Libman and written by Anne-Marie Hess. It is based on the life of Britney Spears. The film stars Natasha Bassett, Peter Benson, Clayton Chitty, Nathan Keyes and Nicole Oliver. The film premiered on Lifetime on February 18, 2017.

The film is an unofficial biopic, as neither Spears nor her team had any involvement with the project. When asked about the project during its production phase, Spears' representative said that Spears would "not be contributing in any way, shape or form to the Lifetime biopic...nor does it have her blessing." The film was panned by the critics for its inaccuracies, performances and screenplay.

Plot

The movie is a loose retelling of the life of pop superstar Britney Spears. It starts from the beginning of her career not including The Mickey Mouse Club. It also goes into her relationship with Justin Timberlake. The movie also covers her marriage to Kevin Federline, her downward spiral and ends with her performing at her residency in Vegas. The movie did not use any of Spears' songs due to the singer and her team not consenting to the movie.

Cast

Reception
The film was critically panned upon release. One writer for NME called the film a "car crash" and criticized it for its numerous inaccuracies and choice of casting. Billboard criticized the film for having "too many pieces missing." The Guardian gave a more mixed review of the film, calling it "tacky, but oddly compelling."

The film was watched by 1.01 million viewers and held a 0.4 rating among viewers 18–49.

References

External links
 
 

2017 biographical drama films
2010s musical drama films
2017 in American television
2017 television films
2017 films
American biographical drama films
American musical drama films
Biographical films about singers
Biographical television films
Cultural depictions of Britney Spears
Cultural depictions of Paris Hilton
Drama films based on actual events
American drama television films
Films shot in Vancouver
Lifetime (TV network) films
2010s English-language films
2010s American films